Macrochilo bivittata, the two-striped snout-moth, is a litter moth of the family Erebidae. The species was first described by Augustus Radcliffe Grote in 1877. It is found from the Atlantic coast west across the parklands and southern boreal forest of North America to central Alberta, south to Massachusetts and Ohio.

The wingspan is 27–28 mm. Adults are on wing in July in Alberta.

References

Herminiinae
Moths of North America
Moths described in 1877